Denis O'Sullivan (born 11 March 1948) is a retired professional  Irish golfer. He won the 1985 Irish Amateur Close and the 1990 Irish Amateur Stroke Play, but did not turn professional until 1997, when he decided to try to qualify for the European Seniors Tour. He came through the European Seniors Tour Qualifying School at his first attempt and became one of the tour's most consistent players. He has won six seniors events and finished in the top ten on the Order of Merit several times, with a best ranking of third in 2000.

Professional wins (6)

European Senior Tour wins (6)

European Senior Tour playoff record (0–1)

Team appearances
Amateur
European Amateur Team Championship (representing Ireland): 1977

Professional
Praia d'El Rey European Cup: 1998 (tie)

External links

Irish male golfers
European Senior Tour golfers
1948 births
Living people